A corporate group or group of companies is a collection of parent and subsidiary corporations that function as a single economic entity through a common source of control. These types of groups are often managed by an account manager. The concept of a group is frequently used in tax law, accounting and (less frequently) company law to attribute the rights and duties of one member of the group to another or the whole. If the corporations are engaged in entirely different businesses, the group is called a conglomerate. The forming of corporate groups usually involves consolidation via mergers and acquisitions, although the group concept focuses on the instances in which the merged and acquired corporate entities remain in existence rather than the instances in which they are dissolved by the parent. The group may be owned by a holding company which may have no actual operations.

In Germany, where a sophisticated law of the "concern" has been developed, the law of corporate groups is a fundamental aspect of its corporate law. Many other European jurisdictions also have a similar approach, while Commonwealth countries and the United States adhere to a formalistic doctrine that refuses to "pierce the corporate veil": corporations are treated outside tax and accounting as wholly separate legal entities.

Legal independence

A corporate group is composed of companies. The general rule is that a company is a separate legal entity from its shareholders, that is the shareholder's liability for the subsidiary's debts is limited to the value of the shares, and the shareholders cannot be required to perform the company's obligations.

However, some jurisdictions create exceptions to this rule. For example, Germany has created affiliated enterprise law which provides situations in which one company is liable for the debts of another company. In New Zealand, the Companies Act provides that the assets of related companies may be pooled to pay the creditors if one of the companies is liquidated. However, the circumstances in which this power will be exercised are very narrow.
 Berkey v Third Avenue Railway

Economic dependence
 Concern (business)
 DHN v Tower Hamlets LBC
 EU Seventh Company Law Directive 83/349, on group accounts
 EU Draft Ninth Company Law Directive, on corporate groups

Law

Accounting
 EU Seventh Company Law Directive 83/349, on group accounts

Civil law
 Salomon v Salomon
 Berkey v Third Avenue Railway
 Adams v Cape Industries plc

Codetermination
 Mitbestimmungsgesetz

Definition
Leff defines business group as a group of companies that does business in different markets under common administrative or financial control whose members are linked by relations of interpersonal trust on the basis of similar personal ethnic or commercial background. One method of defining a group is as a cluster of legally distinct firms with a managerial relationship. The relationship between the firms in a group may be formal or informal. A keiretsu is one type of business group. A concern is another.

Douma and Schreuder (2013) distinguish horizontal and vertical business groups as follows: 'Business groups can be horizontal or vertical as far as their structure is concerned. In a horizontal business group there is no central holding company – the group companies are connected through various formal or informal ties, including reciprocal shareholding. Thus, a horizontal business group is a rather loose confederation of firms. Coordination between them is achieved mainly by mutual adjustment and standardization of norms. Mitsubishi is a well-known example of a horizontal business group as are many other keiretsu. Taiwanese and Chinese groups exhibit similar features. Horizontal business groups are also referred to as associative business groups. A vertical business group is a group of companies controlled, but not entirely owned, by a single investor. Vertical groups are often organized as pyramids of companies controlled by the main investor through a holding company. A unique feature of pyramidal holdings is that it allows the main investor to exert control with a limited amount of capital. Korean chaebols ,Indian business houses and most European business groups are vertical in character. Vertical business groups are also referred to as hierarchical business groups.

Encarnation refers to Indian business houses, emphasizing multiple forms of ties among group members. Powell and Smith-Doerr state that a business group is a network of firms that regularly collaborate over a long time period. Granovetter argues that business groups refers to an intermediate level of binding, excluding on the one hand a set of firms bound merely by short-term alliances and on the other a set of firms legally consolidated into a single unit. Williamson claims that business groups lie between markets and hierarchies; this is further worked out by Douma & Schreuder. Khanna and Rivkin suggest that business groups are typically not legal constructs though some regulatory bodies have attempted to codify a definition. In the United Arab Emirates, a business group can also be known as a trade association. Typical examples are Adidas Group or Icelandair Group.

See also
 Business alliance
 Chaebol
 Concern
 Conglomerate
 Holding company
 Keiretsu
 Subsidiary
 Zaibatsu
 Multinational corporation

Further reading 
 Schmitthoff CM, and Wooldridge F, (eds), Groups of Companies (Sweet & Maxwell 1991)
 Blumberg PI, The Law of Corporate Groups: Tort, Contract and Other Common Law Problems in the Substantive Law of Parent and Subsidiary Corporations (Little, Brown and Company 1987)
 Witting C, Liability of Corporate Groups and Networks (Cambridge University Press 2018)
 Morris CHR, The Law of Financial Services Groups (Oxford University Press 2019)

Notes

Business terms
Strategic management
Corporate groups
Corporate development
Management theory